Poison's Greatest Hits: 1986–1996 is the first greatest hits compilation CD from the glam metal band Poison. The album was released on November 26, 1996 by Capitol Records. The album contains 16 tracks from the band's first four studio albums (Look What the Cat Dragged In, Open Up and Say...Ahh!, Flesh & Blood and Native Tongue) and also the live double-album Swallow This Live.

Background and release
Blues Saraceno replaced Richie Kotzen as lead guitarist after the last album Native Tongue and The Greatest Hits features two bonus new tracks with Blues Saraceno on lead guitar: "Lay Your Body Down" and "Sexual Thing".

The compilation charted at number 2 on the Top Catalog Albums chart in Billboard magazine and includes most of Poison's hit singles which charted on the Billboard Hot 100 or mainstream rock charts. The compilation was certified Gold in 1999 and by 2005 the album had gone double platinum. It was certified gold in Canada.

Track listing

Track information verified from the album's liner notes.

New tracks
The album Crack a Smile featuring Blues Saraceno on lead guitar contained tracks recorded 1994-1995 but remained unreleased at the time of this compilation's release.  Therefore, the last 2 tracks included here were first released on this album as bonus new tracks (1996) and then released again on the Crack a Smile... and More! album in 2000, which was the next Poison album to be released.

Some copies of the album had a hidden picture of the band featuring CC Deville underneath the CD tray.  The CD tray was not made of see through material, and therefore the image was covered up by the neon green plastic.

Personnel
 Bret Michaels - lead vocals, rhythm guitar, harmonica
 Bobby Dall - bass, piano
 Rikki Rockett - drums
 C.C. DeVille - lead guitar on tracks 1 - 6, 8 - 16
 Richie Kotzen - lead guitar on track 7
 Blues Saraceno - lead guitar on tracks 17 - 18

Charts

Certifications

References

1996 greatest hits albums
Albums produced by John Purdell
Albums produced by Bruce Fairbairn
Albums produced by Tom Werman
Albums produced by Duane Baron
Poison (American band) compilation albums
Capitol Records compilation albums